Adolfo Escobar Jardínez (born 26 October 1970) is a Mexican politician from the National Action Party. From 2006 to 2009 he served as Deputy of the LX Legislature of the Mexican Congress representing Tlaxcala.

References

1970 births
Living people
Politicians from Tlaxcala
National Action Party (Mexico) politicians
21st-century Mexican politicians
Members of the Congress of Tlaxcala
Deputies of the LX Legislature of Mexico
Members of the Chamber of Deputies (Mexico) for Tlaxcala